The 2022 Johan Cruyff Shield was the 26th edition of the Johan Cruyff Shield (Dutch: Johan Cruijff Schaal), an annual Dutch football match played between the winners of the previous season's Eredivisie and KNVB Cup. 

The match was contested by Ajax, winner of the Eredivisie, and PSV Eindhoven, winner of the KNVB Cup.

The defending champions were PSV, who won the 2021 Johan Cruyff Shield.

Match

Details

See also 
 2021–22 Eredivisie
 2021–22 KNVB Cup
 AFC Ajax–PSV Eindhoven rivalry

References 

2022–23 in Dutch football
Johan Cruyff Shield
AFC Ajax matches
PSV Eindhoven matches
July 2022 sports events in the Netherlands